Thrangu Rinpoche was born in 1933 in Kham, Tibet. He is deemed to be a prominent tulku (reincarnate lama) in the Kagyu school of Tibetan Buddhism, the ninth reincarnation in his particular line. His full name and title is the Very Venerable Ninth Khenchen Thrangu Tulku, Karma Lodrö  Lungrik Maway Senge. The academic title Khenchen denotes great scholarly accomplishment (English-language analogues include the titles Distinguished Professor and Academic Fellow), and the term Rinpoche ("Precious" or "Precious One") is a Tibetan devotional title which may be accorded to respected teachers and exemplars.

Biography

Early life and exile
Thrangu Rinpoche was installed at Thrangu Monastery in Kham (eastern Tibet) after his identification by the Sixteenth Karmapa and the previous Tai Situpa at age five.  He is one of the principal lamas there, although Traleg Rinpoche is the supreme abbot of the complex. He fled to India following the Chinese invasion in 1959.

At the age of thirty-five Thrangu Rinpoche took the geshe examination in Bengal and was awarded the degree of Geshe Lharampa, the highest degree conferred in the Gelug transmission (it is not uncommon for monks of other lineage to pursue studies in that tradition). He was subsequently awarded the Khenchen degree of the Kagyu tradition. He played a critical role in the recovery of important Buddhist texts that had been largely destroyed by the Chinese Communists. He was named Abbot of Rumtek monastery, the home monastery in exile of the Karmapa, and also of the Nalanda Institute for Higher Buddhist Studies at Rumtek.

Establishment of Buddhist institutions
As Abbot of the Nalanda Institute, Thrangu Rinpoche and Khenpo Tsultrim Gyamtso Rinpoche trained all the younger tulkus of the lineage, including the Dzogchen Ponlop Rinpoche, who was in the first class. He was also the personal tutor of the four principal Karma Kagyu tulkus: Shamar Rinpoche, Tai Situ Rinpoche, Jamgon Kongtrul Rinpoche, and Gyaltsab Rinpoche. Thrangu Rinpoche established the fundamental curriculum of the Karma Kagyu lineage taught at Rumtek. In addition, he taught with Khenpo Karthar Rinpoche, who had been a teacher at Thrangu Rinpoche's monastery in Tibet before 1959, and who is now head of Karma Triyana Dharmachakra in Woodstock, New York, the seat of  Karmapa in North America.

In 1976, after 15 years at Rumtek, Thrangu Rinpoche founded the Thrangu Tashi Choling monastery in Boudhanath, Kathmandu, Nepal, and later also founded a retreat centre and college at Namo Buddha; Tara Abbey, which offers a full dharma education for Tibetan nuns leading to a khenpo degree; a school in Boudhanath for the general education of Tibetan children and young monks in Western subjects and Buddhist studies; and a free medical clinic in an impoverished area of Nepal.

Thrangu Rinpoche recently completed a large monastery in Sarnath, India, overlooking the deer park where the Buddha gave his first teaching on the Four Noble Truths.  The monastery is named Vajra Vidya in honor of the Sixteenth Karmapa. It is now the seat of the major annual Kagyu conference.

Worldwide activities
In 1976, Thrangu Rinpoche began teaching Buddhism throughout Asia and in the West. He founded Thrangu House in Oxford, England, in 1981, then in the United States and Canada, he established centres in Crestone, Colorado, Maine, California, Vancouver and Edmonton. He has another fourteen centres in nine other countries. He is the Abbot of Gampo Abbey, a Karma Kagyu monastery in Cape Breton, Nova Scotia, founded by his dharma brother Chogyam Trungpa Rinpoche, reflective of his close ties the Shambhala Buddhist community.

Rinpoche currently resides in Nepal where he serves as senior tutor to Urgyen Trinley Dorje.

On 25 July 2010, Thrangu Monastery was opened by Thrangu Rinpoche in Richmond, British Columbia, Canada. It is the first traditional Buddhist monastery in Canada. It contains a  gold-plated statue of Shakyamuni Buddha, and the shrine hall can seat 500 people

Bibliography 
Aspirational Prayer for Mahamudra of Rangjung Dorje (1999), Namo Buddha Publications. 
Buddha Nature (1988, 1993), Rangjung Yeshe Publications. 
Buddhist Conduct: The Ten Virtuous Actions (2001), Namo Buddha Publications. 
Creation and Completion (1996, 2002), Wisdom Publications.  
Crystal Clear: Practical Advice for Mahamudra Meditators (2003), Rangjung Yeshe Publications.  
Distinguishing Dharma and Dharmata: A Commentary on the Treatise of Maitreya (2004), Zhyisil Chokyi Ghatsal Publications. 
Essential Practice: Lectures on Kamalashila's Stages of Meditation (2002), Snow Lion. 
Essentials of Mahamudra: Looking Directly at the Mind (2004), Wisdom Publications. 
Everyday Consciousness and Primordial Awareness (2002), Snow Lion. 
The Five Buddha Families and the Eight Consciousnesses (2013), Namo Buddha Publications. 
The Four Dharmas of Gampopa (2013), Namo Buddha Publications. 
Four Foundations of Buddhist Practice (2010), Namo Buddha Publications. 
A Guide to the Bardo (2004), Namo Buddha Publications. 
A Guide to the Bodhisattva's Way of Life of Shantideva (2002).
A Guide to Mahamudra Meditation (2008), Namo Buddha Publications. 
A Guide to Shamatha Meditation (2001), Namo Buddha Publications. 
The Heart of the Dharma: Mind Training for Beginners (2010), KTD Publications. 
A History of Buddhism in India (2008), Zhyisil Chokyi Ghatsal Publications. 
The Jewel Ornament of Liberation (2003), Zhyisil Chokyi Ghatsal Publications. 
Journey of the Mind: Putting the Teachings on the Bardo into Effective Practice (1997), Karma Thekchen Choling, Vancouver.
King of Samadhi: Commentaries on the Samadhi Raja Sutra (2004), Rangjung Yeshe Publications. 
The Life and Spiritual Songs of Milarepa (2003), Zhyisil Chokyi Ghatsal Publications. 
The Life and Teachings of Gampopa (2003), Zhyisil Chokyi Ghatsal Publications. 
The Life of the Buddha and the Four Noble Truths (2009), Namo Buddha Publications. 
The Life of Tilopa and the Ganges Mahamudra (2002), Zhyisil Chokyi Ghatsal Publications. 
Medicine Buddha Teachings (2004), Snow Lion. 
The Middle-Way Meditation Instructions of Mipham Rinpoche (2000), Namo Buddha Publications. 
The Ninth Karmapa's Ocean of Definitive Meaning (2010), Snow Lion. 
An Ocean of the Ultimate Meaning: Teachings on Mahamudra (2004), Snow Lion. 
On Buddha Essence: A Commentary on Rangjung Dorje's Treatise (2006), Shambhala. 
The Open Door to Emptiness (2012), Namo Buddha Publications, 
The Ornament of Clear Realization (2005), Zhyisil Chokyi Ghatsal Publications. 
Pointing Out the Dharmakaya (2003), Snow Lion. 
The Practice of Tranquillity and Insight (1993), Snow Lion. 
Rechungpa: A Biography of Milarepa's Disciple (2011), Namo Buddha Publications. 
Seven Points of Mind Training (2006), Zhyisil Chokyi Ghatsal Publications.
Shentong and Rangtong: Two Views of Emptiness (2009), Namo Buddha Publications. 
Showing the Path to Liberation (2002), Namo Buddha Publications.  
A Song for the King: Saraha on Mahamudra Meditation (2006), Wisdom Publications. 
Songs of Naropa: Commentaries on Songs of Realization (1997), Rangjung Yeshe Publications.
A Spiritual Biography of Marpa the Translator (2001), Zhyisil Chokyi Ghatsal Publications. 
The Spiritual Song of Lodro Thaye (2008), Zhyisil Chokyi Ghatsal Publications. 
Teachings on the Practice of Meditation (2001), Zhyisil Chokyi Ghatsal Publications. 
The Three Vehicles of Buddhist Practice (2003), Namo Buddha Publications. 
Transcending Ego: Distinguishing Consciousness from Wisdom (2001), Namo Buddha Publications. 
The Twelve Links of Interdependent Origination (2013), Namo Buddha Publications. 
The Uttaratantra: A Treatise on Buddha-Essence (2004), Zhyisil Chokyi Ghatsal Publications. 
Vivid Awareness: The Mind Instructions of Khenpo Gangshar (2011), Shambhala.

References

External links
Thrangu Rinpoche's website
Thrangu Rinpoche's Chinese website
Thrangu Rinpoche's Retreat Center in Crestone, Colorado
Thrangu Rinpoche's Shree Mangal Dvip Boarding School for Himalayan children

20th-century Buddhists
21st-century Buddhists
1933 births
Living people
Lamas
Kagyu tulkus
Tibetan Buddhists from Tibet
Rinpoches
20th-century lamas